Lansana is a given name. Notable people with the name include:

Surname:
Alpha Lansana (born 1980), Sierra Leonean international footballer
David Lansana (1922–1975), appointed army commander of Sierra Leone in 1964
Komeh Gulama Lansana, the widow of Brigadier David Lansana, former Commander of the Sierra Leone Armed Forces

Given name:
Lansana Baryoh (born 1987), Sierra Leonean international footballer
Lansana Conté (1934–2008), the President of Guinea from 3 April 1984 until his death on 22 December 2008
Lansana Fadika, Sierra Leonean international businessman, youth activist and politician
Lansana Kouyaté (born 1950), Guinean diplomat and political figure who served as Prime Minister of Guinea from 2007 to 2008
Louis Lansana Beavogui (1923–1984), Guinean politician